The Lyttelton Timeball Station  is a heritage-registered time ball station and prominent local landmark in Lyttelton, New Zealand. The original station was significantly damaged by a series of earthquakes and aftershocks in 2010 and 2011, and finally collapsed on 13 June 2011 after a magnitude 6.4 aftershock.
The tower was subsequently reconstructed, reopening in November 2018.

Context
A time ball is a large painted wooden or metal ball that drops at a predetermined time, principally to enable sailors to check their marine chronometers from their boats offshore. While latitude has long been easily determined first using an astrolabe and later a sextant, timekeeping is one way of enabling mariners to determine their longitude at sea.

History 
John Thomas Peacock, a businessman and politician, first came to Lyttelton in 1844. He built the first substantial wharf and was well established by the time large numbers of settlers started arriving six years later with the First Four Ships. Peacock first promoted the erection of a time ball station in Lyttelton as a Member of the House of Representatives, but his suggestion was rejected. He was also a Member of the Canterbury Provincial Council, and his suggestion in 1870 for a Lyttelton time ball found support. It was the third time ball in New Zealand, after Wellington (1864) and Dunedin (1868).

The station, which was designed by local architect Thomas Cane, was completed in 1876. The castle-like complex initially comprised an octagonal tower supporting the time ball and a three-storey building which provided accommodation, work areas as well as housing the clock. The materials used were local scoria and contrasting lighter coloured Oamaru stone. Additions were made to the building between 1877 and 1878 and again in 1912. The astronomical clock originated from Britain and the time ball was supplied by Siemens Brothers of Germany.

The tower was damaged during the 2010 Canterbury earthquake and the operation of the time ball stopped. The buildings were significantly damaged during the February 2011 Christchurch earthquake. The New Zealand Heritage Trust decided that it would be dismantled after engineering advice indicated that the building could not be saved due to public safety concerns, though they hoped to salvage the time ball mechanism and were investigating whether reconstruction was a viable option. The tower collapsed during an aftershock on 13 June 2011.

On 25 May 2013, it was announced that the tower and ball would be restored, and that funds were to be sought from the community to rebuild the rest of the station.

The tower rebuild took place between July 2017 and November 2018, and the area has since reopened to the public.

Heritage listing
On 7 April 1983, the building was registered as a Category I heritage item, with the registration number being 43. Including Lyttelton, there were only five time ball stations in working order worldwide at the time, and the one in Lyttelton was the only one remaining in New Zealand.

The heritage listing was withdrawn following the station's destruction in the Canterbury earthquakes.

References

External links 

 "Time for a Change". New Zealand Historic Places Trust article, 2008
Timeball 3D Model. Sketchfab 3D model, by ThunderDrone
International conference – Rebuilt. Paper about the scan and the survey of timeball

Heritage New Zealand Category 1 historic places in Canterbury, New Zealand
Tourist attractions in Christchurch
Transport infrastructure completed in 1876
Towers completed in 1876
Buildings and structures demolished as a result of the 2011 Christchurch earthquake
Lyttelton, New Zealand
1870s architecture in New Zealand